January 27 - Eastern Orthodox liturgical calendar - January 29

All fixed commemorations below are observed on February 10 by Orthodox Churches on the Old Calendar.

For January 28th, Orthodox Churches on the Old Calendar commemorate the Saints listed on January 15.

Saints
 Venerable Ephraim the Syrian (373)
 Venerable Palladius the Hermit of Antioch, Wonderworker (4th century)
 The Holy Two Martyrs, mother and daughter, by the sword.
 Martyr Charita.
 Saint Isaac the Syrian, Bishop of Nineveh (7th century)
 Venerable James the Ascetic, of Porphyreon (Porphyrianos) in Palestine.
 Saint George Ugryn the Martyr (1015), brother of Ephraim of Novotorzhok
 Venerable Ephraim of Novotorzhok, Abbot and Wonderworker, founder of the Sts. Boris and Gleb Monastery (Novotorzhok) (1053)

Pre-Schism Western saints
 Saint Flavian, a deputy-prefect of Rome, martyred in Civitavecchia in Italy under Diocletian (ca. 304)
 Saint Valerius, Bishop of Saragossa in Spain, with whom St Vincent served as deacon (315)
 Cannera (Cainder, Kinnera), Virgin on the Isle of Inniscathy, Bantry Bay, Ireland (ca. 530) 
 Saint John of Reomans (John of Reomay (Réomé)), in Gaul (544) 
 Saints Brigid and Maura, daughters of a Scottish Chieftain, Martyrs in Picardy while on pilgrimage to Rome.
 Saint Antimus, one of the first Abbots of Brantôme in France (8th century)
 Saint Glastian, patron saint of Kinglassie in Fife in Scotland (830) 
 Saint Odo of Beauvais, Bishop of Beauvais (880)

Post-Schism Orthodox saints
 Venerable Ephraim of the Kiev Caves, Bishop of Pereyaslavl (ca. 1098)
 Venerable Theodosius, founder of Totma Monastery (Vologda) (1568)

New martyrs and confessors
 Saint Theodore, presbyter, Confessor (1933)
 New Hiero-confessor Arsenius (Stadnitsky), Metropolitan of Tashkent and Turkestan (1936)
 New Hieromartyr Ignatius (Sadkovsky), Bishop of Skopin (1938) 
 New Hieromartyr Vladimir Pishchulin, Priest, at Simferopol (1938)
 New Hieromartyr Bartholomew (Ratnykh), Hieromonk, at Feodosia (Crimea) (1938)
 Virgin-martyr Olga (1938)
 New Hiero-confessor Archimandrite Leontius (Stasevich) of Jablechna (Poland), who reposed at Mikhailovsk (Ivanovo) (Russia) (1972)

Other commemorations
 "Sumorin Totma" Icon of the Mother of God (16th century)

Icon gallery

Notes

References

Sources
 January 28 / February 10. Orthodox Calendar (PRAVOSLAVIE.RU).
 February 10 / January 28. HOLY TRINITY RUSSIAN ORTHODOX CHURCH (A parish of the Patriarchate of Moscow).
 January 28. OCA - The Lives of the Saints.
 The Autonomous Orthodox Metropolia of Western Europe and the Americas (ROCOR). St. Hilarion Calendar of Saints for the year of our Lord 2004. St. Hilarion Press (Austin, TX). pp. 10–11.
 January 28. Latin Saints of the Orthodox Patriarchate of Rome.
 The Roman Martyrology. Transl. by the Archbishop of Baltimore. Last Edition, According to the Copy Printed at Rome in 1914. Revised Edition, with the Imprimatur of His Eminence Cardinal Gibbons. Baltimore: John Murphy Company, 1916. pp. 28–29.
 Rev. Richard Stanton. A Menology of England and Wales, or, Brief Memorials of the Ancient British and English Saints Arranged According to the Calendar, Together with the Martyrs of the 16th and 17th Centuries. London: Burns & Oates, 1892. p. 38.
Greek Sources
 Great Synaxaristes:  28 ΙΑΝΟΥΑΡΙΟΥ. ΜΕΓΑΣ ΣΥΝΑΞΑΡΙΣΤΗΣ.
  Συναξαριστής. 28 Ιανουαρίου. ECCLESIA.GR. (H ΕΚΚΛΗΣΙΑ ΤΗΣ ΕΛΛΑΔΟΣ). 
Russian Sources
  10 февраля (28 января). Православная Энциклопедия под редакцией Патриарха Московского и всея Руси Кирилла (электронная версия). (Orthodox Encyclopedia - Pravenc.ru).
  28 января (ст.ст.) 10 февраля 2013 (нов. ст.). Русская Православная Церковь Отдел внешних церковных связей. (DECR).

January in the Eastern Orthodox calendar